Selma Mall is an enclosed shopping mall located in Selma, Alabama. The mall opened in 1971 with Sears, Britt's (a division of J.J. Newberry) and S.H. Kress as its major stores. By the 1990s, Kress had become McCrory Stores, and Beall-Ladymon had joined as a central anchor. The anchor stores are Treasure Box Flea and Antique Mall and Belk.

Sears closed in 1993 and became McRae's (now part of Belk) three years later. Goody's, which replaced the former Beall-Ladymon, reopened in 2011 after closing in 2008. Steele's was added in 2011 as another anchor. In January 2014, JCPenney announced the pending closure of its Selma Mall store. In August 2019, Treasure Box Flea and Antique Mall was opened in former JCPenney space.

References

Shopping malls in Alabama
Buildings and structures in Selma, Alabama
Shopping malls established in 1971
1971 establishments in Alabama